Abraham Erb (12 July 17726 September 1830), sometimes called the founder of Waterloo, Ontario, was the first Mennonite settler from Pennsylvania. His brother John is considered the founder of the Preston community in Cambridge, Ontario. Abraham offered help to many immigrants from his native Pennsylvania area through the means of education, shelter, and employment as they chose to move from the United States to Upper Canada. He was married to Magdaena and had one biological child, who died at the age of seven, and two adoptive children. His adopted son was named Barnabas, a noted land speculator.

Erb also built what is now known as the Erb-Kumpf House in c. 1812, making it likely the oldest home in Waterloo or one of the oldest homes in Waterloo.

References

External links 
 

People from Waterloo, Ontario
Canadian Mennonites
American emigrants to pre-Confederation Ontario
History of Waterloo, Ontario
1772 births
1830 deaths
Canadian city founders
American emigrants to Canada
People from Lancaster County, Pennsylvania
Christians from Pennsylvania
American Mennonites
Burials at First Mennonite Cemetery, Kitchener, Ontario